Concrete is a composite material composed of aggregate and a binder.

Concrete may also refer to:

Arts and entertainment
 Concrete (comics), a comic book series by Paul Chadwick
 Concrete (film), a 2004 Japanese film based on the Junko Furuta murder
 Concrete (novel), a 1982 novel by Thomas Bernhard

Music
 The Concretes, a Swedish indie pop band

Albums
 The Concretes (album), 2003
 Concrete (Fear Factory album), 2002
 Concrete (Pet Shop Boys album), 2006
 Concrete (Izzy Stradlin album), 2008
 Concrete (Sunny Sweeney album), 2011
 Concrete, by 999, 1981

Songs
 Concrete (Shame song), 2017
 "Concrete", by As It Is from Never Happy, Ever After
 "Concrete", by Crystal Castles from Amnesty (I)
 "Concrete", by E-40 from Revenue Retrievin': Graveyard Shift
 "Concrete", by Poppy from I Disagree
 "Concrete", by Teyana Taylor from The Album
 "Concrete", by Tom Odell from Wrong Crowd
 "Concrete", by Lovejoy from Pebble Brain

Publications
 Concrete (student newspaper), at the University of East Anglia in Norwich
 Concrete Magazine, a publication of The Concrete Society

Places in the United States
 Concrete, Colorado, an unincorporated community and former factory town
 Concrete, North Dakota, a community
 Concrete, DeWitt County, Texas, an unincorporated community
 Concrete, Guadalupe County, Texas, a former town
 Concrete, Washington, a town

Other uses
 Concrete (Alserkal Avenue), a building in Dubai
 Concrete (perfumery), a product of solvent extraction from plants
 Concrete (philosophy), the opposite of abstract
 Concrete CMS, an open source content management system popularly called concrete
 Concrete, a style of milkshake

See also
 Concrete art or concretism, an abstractionist movement
 Concrete poetry, a form of poetry
 Musique concrète, making music from unusual sounds including "real world" sounds